Not eXactly C, or NXC, is a high-level programming language for the Lego Mindstorms NXT designed by John Hansen in 2006. NXC, which is short for Not eXactly C, is based on Next Byte Codes, an assembly language. NXC has a syntax like C. The IDE for NXC is the Bricx Command Center.

The NXC compiler is available under the Mozilla Public License. A sample code is as shown below:
 task main() //sets a new task. main() is compulsory
 {
      OnFwd(OUT_BC,75); //ask the motors connected to ports B and C to move forward at a power of 75.
      Wait(5000); //wait for 5 seconds [the value is in milliseconds](note that 1000 = 1 second)
      Off(OUT_BC); //off the motors connected to ports B and C
 }

See also
 Lego Mindstorms
 Lego Mindstorms NXT
 Lego Mindstorms NXT 2.0
 Robotics Invention System
 URBI
 Bricx Command Center
 Not Quite C

External links
nxcEditor
Bricx Command Center
Not eXactly C
NXC Tutorial
NXC Guide
A NXT 2.0 robot in action, programmed using NXC.

References 

C programming language family
Robot programming languages
Lego Mindstorms
2006 in robotics